These are the official results of the Men's 1500 metres event at the 1993 IAAF World Championships in Stuttgart, Germany. There were a total number of 43 participating athletes, with four qualifying heats, three semi-finals and the final held on Sunday 1993-08-22.

Final

Semi-finals
Held on Friday 1993-08-20

Qualifying heats
Held on Thursday 1993-08-19

See also
 1990 Men's European Championships 1500 metres (Split)
 1991 Men's World Championships 1500 metres (Tokyo)
 1992 Men's Olympic 1500 metres (Barcelona)
 1994 Men's European Championships 1500 metres (Helsinki)
 1995 Men's World Championships 1500 metres (Gothenburg)

References
 Results
 Results - World Athletics

 
1500 metres at the World Athletics Championships